Cystoseira elegans is a species of brown algae in the genus Cystoseira endemic to the Mediterranean.

Hydroxylated diterpenoid-hydroquinones can be isolated from C. elegans.

References

External links 
 Cystoseira elegans on www.algaebase.org

Fucales
Species described in 1912